Centerville Township may refer to:

 Centerville Township, in Yell County, Arkansas
 Centerville Township, Linn County, Kansas, in Linn County, Kansas
 Centerville Township, Neosho County, Kansas, in Neosho County, Kansas
 Centerville Township, Michigan
 Centerville Township, Faulk County, South Dakota, in Faulk County, South Dakota
 Centerville Township, Turner County, South Dakota, in Turner County, South Dakota

Township name disambiguation pages